A clapper loader or second assistant camera (2nd AC) is part of a film crew whose main functions are that of loading the raw film stock into camera magazines, operating the clapperboard (slate) at the beginning of each take, marking the actors as necessary, and maintaining all records and paperwork for the camera department. The name "clapper loader" tends to be used in the United Kingdom and Commonwealth, while "second assistant camera" tends to be favored in the United States, but the job is essentially the same whichever title is used. The specific responsibilities and division of labor within the department will almost always vary depending on the circumstances of the shoot.

Functions 
Clapper loaders have a very important role as practically the only people on set who directly and physically oversee the state of the undeveloped negative. The loader – the only person who actually handles the negative between the manufacturer and the laboratory –  thus can easily render an entire day's work useless if the film is handled improperly. Additionally, the loader usually controls all records with regard to the film stock – from when it is received until when it is sent out to the lab; if this information is miscommunicated or missing, this too can destroy an expensive shoot. Furthermore, the loader usually has much more to do in addition to these tasks. Noted director of photography Oliver Stapleton has written on his website:

Duties 
A full description of the job duties includes the following (although different shoots may often not always require all of these):
generally assisting the rest of the camera crew (focus puller, camera operator, director of photography)
utilizing the camera trainee, film loader, and/or camera runner if one has been brought onto the production
keeping inventory of all equipment, film, and expendables
requesting film stock as needed
securing the equipment
unloading/loading equipment off/on the camera truck daily if necessary
checking loading materials and spaces to prevent light leaks
cleaning and keeping clean the magazines and the loading environment
organizing and cleaning the equipment space
maintaining and cleaning the equipment
loading and unloading of film stock from and to the magazines
labelling of equipment, boxes, magazines, and storage spaces
marking actors and props (leaving a marker of their positions as the scene is blocked for the purpose of measuring distance from the camera so that its focus can be adjusted throughout the scene)
marking and operating the clapperboard properly
keeping meticulous and accurate camera notes
writing negative report sheets in detail
interfacing with continuity in order to note which takes to print
charging of batteries for camera and accessories
preparation of film to be sent to the lab
keeping records of time, per diems, and expenses for the entire camera crew
liaising regularly with production, rental houses, editing, laboratories, and unions
recordkeeping of all camera-related paperwork, including negative reports, daily stock reports, film inventory reports, lab orders, rental contracts, and expendable orders
ensuring that all instructions from the director of photography are passed along properly to labs and post houses
relaying reports from the lab about the rushes to the director of photography

References 

Filmmaking occupations
Cinematography